Frances "Fran" Krauskopf Conley (born August 12, 1940, in Palo Alto, California) is a professor of neurosurgery at Stanford University.  She is the author of Walking Out on the Boys (1998), the story of her protest of misogyny at the university hospital. She is a crucial figure in the advancement of women in American medicine.

Medical career
In 1966 she became the first woman to pursue a surgical internship at Stanford Hospital, in 1975 she became the first female faculty member at Stanford in any surgical department, in 1977, she became the fifth woman to become a board certified neurosurgeon in the United States,
in 1982 the first woman to be granted a tenured professorship in neurosurgery at a U.S. medical school, and in 1986, the first to have a full professorship.

Early life 
Conley was born in 1940 to Konrad Bates Krauskopf and Kathryn McCune Krauskopf. She essentially grew up on the Stanford campus where her father was a professor of geochemistry. She decided in her early teenage years that she wanted to become a doctor even though the housewife stigma was the norm of the time.

She attended Bryn Mawr College in Lower Merion Township, Pennsylvania. In her junior year, she returned to Stanford. She then entered medical school at Stanford in 1961. Her class consisted of twelve women and sixty men and she noticed that male and female students were treated much differently. During her time at Stanford medical school, she quickly realized her true passion: surgery. Surgery was a male-dominated sub-field of medicine, but this did not stop Conley from pursuing it and she ended up finishing her M.D. degree in 1966.

She met her future husband, Phil Conley, during her time at Stanford.

Stanford University
In June 1991, she publicly resigned in protest over the work environment that included sexist attitudes and outright sexual
harassment that culminated in the appointment of Dr. Gerald Silverberg as acting chair of the department of neurosurgery despite accusations against him of sexual harassment by two clerical staff.  Several months later, after promises of changes in university procedures and policies on sexism, she rescinded her resignation in an effort to ensure the changes might actually be implemented.

Her book Walking Out on the Boys spotlit misogyny at one of the nation's leading universities and led to changes in programming
throughout the country.

She was also chair of the Stanford University Academic Council in 1997 and 1998 and is now retired.  In her later, executive appointments she worked to enact the reforms that had long been asserted to be unnecessary, already achieved, or imminent.

Walking Out on the Boys 
When Conley resigned from Stanford University, her book Walking Out on the Boys (Ferrar, Straus and Giroux, 1998) was released and provided a very in-depth and a firsthand look at the sexism that really went on at the university.  Conley also boldly uses the real names of the biggest perpetrators. This book offers some behind-the-scenes views of the medical school located at Stanford including certain labs and research. Her resignation and the release of this book not only created some public support towards her, but also towards other instances of sexism across the country that not only occur in medical schools of universities but throughout hospitals and research environments as well.

Personal life
In 1971, Conley was the first official women's winner of the Bay to Breakers 12K footrace with a time of 50:45. Her husband, Phil Conley, was also an athlete, representing the United States in track and field at the 1956 Olympics.

See also
Bryn Mawr College
Stanford University School of Medicine

References

External links
"Walking Out on The Boys: Dr. Frances Conley". Time. July 8, 1991. (interview)
Biography from U.S. National Library of Medicine

Stanford Graduate School of Business alumni
Stanford University School of Medicine faculty
American women writers
Living people
1940 births
21st-century American women